Hertz vectors, or the Hertz vector potentials, are an alternative formulation of the electromagnetic potentials. They are most often introduced in electromagnetic theory textbooks as practice problems for students to solve. There are multiple cases where they have a practical use, including antennas and waveguides. Though they are sometimes used in such practice problems, they are still rarely mentioned in most electromagnetic theory courses, and when they are they are often not practiced in a manner that demonstrates when they may be useful or provide a simpler method to solving a problem than more commonly practiced methods.

Overview 
Hertz vectors can be advantageous when solving for the electric and magnetic fields in certain scenarios, as they provide an alternative way to define the scalar potential  and the vector potential  which are used to find the fields as is commonly done.

Considering cases of electric and magnetic polarization separately for simplicity, each can be defined in terms of the scalar and vector potentials which then allows for the electric and magnetic fields to be found. For cases of just electric polarization the following relations are used.

And for cases of solely magnetic polarization they are defined as:

To apply these, the polarizations need to be defined so that the form of the Hertz vectors can be obtained. Considering the case of simple electric polarization provides the path to finding this form via the wave equation. Using these to solve for the  vectors is similar to how the auxiliary fields  and  can be found, however here the Hertz vectors treat the electric and magnetic polarizations as sources.

This is simply done by applying the d'Alembert operator  to both vectors, keeping in mind that , and the result is non-zero due to the polarizations that are present. This provides a direct pathway between easily determined properties such as current density  to fields via the Hertz vectors and their relations to the scalar and vector potentials. These wave equations yield the following solutions for the Hertz vectors:

where  and  should be evaluated at the retarded time . The electric and magnetic fields can then be found using the Hertz vectors. For simplicity in observing the relationship between polarization, the Hertz vectors, and the fields, only one source of polarization (electric or magnetic) will be considered at a time. In the absence of any magnetic polarization, the  vector is used to find the fields as follows:

Similarly, in the case of only magnetic polarization being present, the fields are determined via the previously stated relations to the scalar and vector potentials.

For the case of both electric and magnetic polarization being present, the fields become

Examples

Oscillating dipole
Consider a one dimensional, uniformly oscillating current. The current is aligned along the z-axis in some length of conducting material  with an oscillation frequency . We will define the polarization vector 

where  is evaluated at the retarded time . Inserting this into the electric Hertz vector equation knowing that the length  is small and the polarization is in one dimension it can be approximated in spherical coordinates as follows

Continuing directly to taking the divergence quickly becomes messy due to the  denominator. This is readily resolved by using Legendre Polynomials for expanding a  potential:

The Hertz vector is now written as follows.

Taking the divergence

Then the gradient of the result

Finally finding the second partial with respect to time

Allows for finding the electric field

Simulation

Using the appropriate conversions to Cartesian coordinates, this field can be simulated in a 3D grid. Viewing the X-Y plane at the origin shows the two-lobed field in one plane we expect from a dipole, and it oscillates in time. The image below shows the shape of this field and how the polarity reverses in time due to the cosine term, however it does not currently show the amplitude change due to the time varying strength of the current. Regardless, its shape alone shows the effectiveness of using the electric Hertz vector in this scenario. This approach is significantly more straightforward than finding the electric field in terms of charges within the infinitely thin wire, especially as they vary with time. This is just one of several examples of when the use of Hertz vectors is advantageous compared to more common methods.

Current loop
Consider a small loop of area  carrying a time varying current . With current flow, a magnetic field perpendicular to the direction of flow as a result of the right hand rule will be present. Due to this field being generated in a loop, it is expected that the field would look similar to that of an electric dipole. This can be proven quickly using Hertz vectors. First the magnetic polarization is determined by its relation to magnetic moment . Inserting this into , and then into Equation, the magnetic Hertz vector is found in a simple form.

The electric field is then found through

Simulation
This field was simulated using Python by converting the spherical component to x and y components. The result is as expected. Due to the changing current, there is a time dependent magnetic field which induces an electric field. Due to the shape, the field appears as if it were a dipole.

See also 

 Dipole antenna

References

Electromagnetism